Mykola Syrash (born 7 February 1999) is a Ukrainian professional footballer who plays as a midfielder for FC Chernihiv in the Ukrainian First League.

Player career
In 2018 he signed for Zirka-2 Kropyvnytskyi for two seasons, appearing in 43 matches. In 2020, he signed for Desna-2 Chernihiv, the reserve squad of Desna Chernihiv, for whom he played in 16 matches.

FC Chernihiv
On 23 August 2022 he signed for FC Chernihiv in the Ukrainian First League. On 27 August he made his debut against Skoruk Tomakivka at the Yunist Stadium in Chernihiv. On 23 October, he scored his first goal with the new club against Hirnyk-Sport Horishni Plavni.

Career statistics

Club

References

External links
 Mykola Syrash at FC Chernihiv 
 

1999 births
Living people
Footballers from Chernihiv
FC Zirka-2 Kropyvnytskyi players
FC Desna-2 Chernihiv players
FC Chernihiv players
FC Kudrivka players
Ukrainian footballers
Association football midfielders
Ukrainian First League players